The Saint-Père Lake (English: Holly Father Lake) is a body of water in the eastern part of the Senneterre territory in the La Vallée-de-l'Or Regional County Municipality (RCM), in the administrative region of Abitibi-Témiscamingue, in the province of Quebec, in Canada. This body of water extends entirely in the canton of Saint-Père.

Forestry is the main economic activity of the sector.

The hydrographic slope of Lake Saint-Père is accessible through a forest road that passes north of the lake and another that passes south near Lake Cemetery.

The surface of the Saint-Père River is usually frozen from early November to mid-May, however safe ice circulation is generally from mid-November to mid-April.

Geography

Toponymy
The toponym "Lac Saint-Père" was made official on December 5, 1968 by the Commission de toponymie du Québec, i.e. during its creation.

Notes and references

See also 

Lakes of Abitibi-Témiscamingue
[[Category:Nottaway River drainage basin]